Acraea alciope, the Hewitson's acraea or alciope acraea, is a butterfly in the family Nymphalidae which is native to the African tropics and subtropics.

Range
It is found in Guinea, Sierra Leone, Liberia, Ivory Coast, Ghana, Togo, Nigeria, Cameroon, Bioko, the Republic of the Congo, the Central African Republic, the Democratic Republic of the Congo, Rwanda, south-western Uganda and Zambia.

Description
 
Acraea alciope Hew. (57 e). The female has developed several forms, but the male varies little. In the male the hindwing and the transverse band of the fore wing are light ochre-yellow and the dark marginal band on the upperside of the hindwing about 4 mm. in breadth. In the female the transverse band of the forewing is brown-yellow and distally incised; the hindwing is brown-yellow and has a broad dark marginal band as in the male. Ivory Coast to the Congo and Uganda. 
 female-ab. macarina Btlr. (57 e) only differs from the typical male in having the dark marginal band on the upperside of the hindwing absent or at least posteriorly very narrow. Gold Coast to the Congo. 
 female-ab. bakossua Strand [unavailable name]. Transverse band of the forewing in the anterior third white, narrower than usual. Cameroon mountains. 
 female-ab. cretacea Eltringh. has a whitish transverse band on the forewing. Lagos. 
 female-ab. fumida Eltringh. has both wings dark brown and almost without markings. Lagos. 
 female-ab. aurivillii Stgr. (57e) [now species Acraea aurivillii]. Transverse band of the forewing orange-yellow, hindwing blackish with a white median band 5 mm. in breadth. Cameroons to Uganda. 
 female-ab. latifasciata Grunb. [now Acraea aurivillii ab. latifasciata Grünberg, 1910] only differs from aurivillii in having the transverse band of the forewing not incised on the distal side, but almost entire-margined and broader. Sesse Islands. 
 female-ab. fella Eltringh.[Acraea aurivillii] Transverse band of the fore wing orange-yellow; hindwing yellow-brown with the dark marginal band sharply defined but narrow and gradually decreasing in breadth towards the anal angle. Uganda. 
 schecana Rothsch. & Jord. [now Acraea aurivillii ssp. schecana Rothschild & Jordan, 1905] seems to be a separate race occurring in Abyssinia; the male has the transverse band of the forewing lighter and the marginal band of the hindwing broader; female unknown.

Biology
The habitat consists of forests.

The larvae feed on Theobroma cacao, Fleurya and Musanga species.

Taxonomy
It is a member of the Acraea jodutta  species group – but see also Pierre & Bernaud, 2014

References

External links

Die Gross-Schmetterlinge der Erde 13: Die Afrikanischen Tagfalter. Plate XIII 57 e also as macarina
Images representing Acraea alciope at Bold

Butterflies described in 1852
alciope